Hologerrhum dermali, also known commonly as Crombie's stripe-lipped snake and Dermal's cylindrical snake, is a species of snake in the family Cyclocoridae. The species is endemic to the Philippines.

Etymology
The specific name, dermali, is in honor of American herpetologist Ronald Crombie whose nickname is "Dermal".

Geographic range
H. dermali is found on the island of Panay.

Habitat

Reproduction
H. dermali is oviparous.

References

Further reading
Brown RM, Leviton AE, Ferner JW, Sison RV (2001). "A New Snake of the Genus Hologerrhum Günther (Reptilia; Squamata; Colubridae) from Panay Island, Philippines". Asiatic Herpetological Research 9: 9–22. (Hologerrhum dermali, new species).
Gaulke M (2011). The Herpetofauna of Panay Island, Philippines. Frankfurt am Main, Germany: Edition Chimaira. 390 pp. . (Hologerrhum dermali, p. 284).

Cyclocoridae
Snakes of Asia
Reptiles of the Philippines
Endemic fauna of the Philippines
Reptiles described in 2001